Cobrabald River, a mostly perennial river that is part of the Namoi catchment within the Murray–Darling basin, is located in the Northern Tablelands district of New South Wales, Australia.

The entire length of the Cobrabald River is within the boundaries of Walcha Shire and Vernon County.

The country along the Cobrabald River is a rich grazing area used for rearing livestock.

The Walcha fishing club stocks this river annually and it is one of the best trout fishing rivers in NSW. A fossicking area is also available in a reserve just off the Niangala Road and along the Cobrabald River.

See also

Rivers of New South Wales
List of rivers of Australia

References

External links
 

 

Rivers of New South Wales
Murray-Darling basin